Christopher Morris (28 April 1942 – 11 March 2015) was an English accountant who was liquidator of some of the most notable British business failures of the twentieth century, such as Bank of Credit & Commerce International, Laker Airways and Polly Peck.

References

English accountants
1942 births
2015 deaths
People from Kent
20th-century English businesspeople